Sayyid ul Sadaat Mir Hasan ibn Azimullah was an islamic scholar, Jurist, Sufi Saint, theologian, preacher, noble and leader of the community of the descendants of Prophet Muhammad, respect with the title Sayyid ul Sadaat.

Life and career 
Sayyid Mir Hasan was born into a prominent family of Sayyids, i.e. descendants of Prophet Muhammad. He is a patrilineal descendant of Imam Musa Al-Kazim.

He started his career as an islamic scholar by studying the Quran and Sunnah and deepened his knowledge in the mystical Sufi path of Islam, as a prerequisite to be fit as a leader of the Sayyid community. He was taught by his father Sayyid Azimullah ibn Nimatullah and high-ranking Sufi Saints of his time.

He eventually became very prominent and guided the Sayyid community of Khorasan region, which encompassed Sayyids belonging to various Sufi Saints, like Gilani Sayyids, the descendants of Bahauddin Naqshband and Hazrat Ishaan and various other Musavi Sayyids.

Although the Musavis were mainly of Shiite faith, including leading Ayatollahs in Persia until today, he remained the only significant Musavi of Sunni faith and descent.

This was very rare and received the attraction of various Muslims. He further attracted people due to his knowledge and capabilities of leadership and legitimated his leadership over the Sayyids as the inheritor of the Khirqa of the 2nd Imam Hasan ibn Ali and the 3rd Imam Hussein ibn Ali.

The reason why he put an emphasis on Sunni Islam as Musavi Sayyid was in his point of view the more esoteric understanding of the history of the Sayyids and twelve Imams in particular.

Although many Shiites distanced themselves from the Imams of the four madhhabs, i.e. legal schools of Sunni Islam, Sayyid Mir Hasan respected them highly since all of them were students of a particular Twelver Shiite Imam, i.e. his ancestors. Imam Abu Hanifa and Imam Malik were both students of his ancestor the 6th Imam Jafar al-Sadiq, Imam Shafii in turn was a student of Imam Malik and Imam Ahmad of Imam Shafii and the 9th Imam Muhammad al-Jawad.

As a Sufi he preached the Qadiri and Naqshbandi Sufi way and initiated his children to Sufism.

His oldest son Sayyid Mir Jan became the spiritual successor of the Naqshbandi order. 

Today the descendants of Sayyid Mir Hassan are known as Dakik Family.

Ancestry 
 1 Muhammad
 2 Ali and Fatima Al Zahra
 3 Imam Hussain Shaheede Reza
 4 Imam Ali Zayn al-Abidin
 5 Imam Muhammad al Baqir
 6 Imam Ja'far al-Sadiq
 7 Imam Musa al Kazim
 8 Abu Qasim Sayyid Mir Hamza
 9 Sayyid Mir Qasim
 10 Sayyid Mir Ahmad
 11 Sayyid Mir Muhammad
 12 Sayyid Mir Ismail Muhammad Hakim
 13 Khwaja Sayyid Mir Latif
 14 Khwaja Sayyid Mir Muhammad
 15 Khwaja Sayyid Mir Kulal
 16 Khwaja Sayyid Mir Ahmad
 17 Khwaja Sayyid Mir Hashim
 18 Khwaja Sayyid Mir Mustaali
 19 Khwaja Sayyid Mir Dost Ali
 20 Khwaja Sayyid Mir Muhammad Latif
 21 Khwaja Sayyid Mir Abdullah
 22 Khwaja Sayyid Mir Muhammad Shamah
 23 Khwaja Sayyid Mir Latifullah
 24 Khwaja Sayyid Mir Ruhollah
 25 Khwaja Sayyid Mir Baitullah
 26 Khwaja Sayyid Mir Nimatullah
 27 Khwaja Sayyid Mir Azimullah
 28 Khwaja Sayyid Mir Hasan

Personal life 
Sayyid Mir Hasan had married one wife and issued 5 sons and 6 daughters.

Among his children are the following:

1. Sayyid Mir Jan, leader of the Naqshbandi order, who is believed to be "the chosen one" awaited by the followers of Hazrat Ishaan

2. Mir Sayyid Mahmud Agha, Sufi Saint, representative and right hand of Sayyid Mir Jan

3. Sayyid Mir Fazlullah Agha, Sufi Saint, Grand Mufti

Legacy

Sayyid Hasan ibn Azimullah is venerated as the patriarch of the family of Sayyid Mir Jan, who are seen as the modern leaders of the Naqshbandi order according to the believe of the followers of Hazrat Ishaan.

His descendants are known as pious Muslims venerated by followers in Punjab and Kashmir.

Among his descendants remained popular Saints and representative Sayyids living in Germany and California.

See also 
Abdul Qadir Jilani
Mir Sayyid Ali Hamadani
Ali Hujwiri
Bahauddin Naqshband
Moinuddin Chishti
Hazrat Ishaan
Ziyarat Naqshband Sahab
Sayyid Mir Jan
Sayyid Ali Akbar
Sayyid Mir Fazlullah Agha

References 

Husaynids
Sufi religious leaders
Naqshbandi order
Sufi mystics
Sufi poets
Sufi saints
Year of birth missing (living people)
Living people